is a Japanese film directed by Shūji Terayama which was released in France in 1979 and in Japan in 1983.

Plot
A surreal excursion into a young man's subconscious as he searches for the words to a tune that his mother may have sung to him as a child. The dreamlike images culminate in a scene of a girl's naked body covered with calligraphic characters.

Cast
Hiroshi Mikami as Akira (as a boy)
Takeshi Wakamatsu as Akira (as a man)
Keiko Niitaka as Mother
Juzo Itami as Principal / Priest / Old man
Miho Fukuya as Girl
Masaharu Satō

Release
Grass Labyrinth was originally one of the installments in a French movie package called Private Collections, the other two sections being directed by Walerian Borowczyk and Just Jaeckin, both associated with avant-garde films with strong sexual content. Grass Labyrinth was the longest of the three and was later (1983) released as a separate film in Japan.

Awards and nominations
8th Hochi Film Award 
 Won: Best Actor - Juzo Itami

References

External links

1979 films
French short films
Films directed by Shūji Terayama
1970s Japanese-language films
Toei Company films
Japanese short films
1970s Japanese films